Chaostar is a classical, opera and vocal orchestra from Greece started in 1998, composed of Christos Antoniou, Spiros Antoniou, Sotiris Vayenas, Nathalie Rassoulis, and Sapfo Stavridou.  Several of the members are also members of Septic Flesh. They have released four albums on Holy Records, a label with notable artists such as Elend, Orphaned Land, and Septic Flesh.

Discography 
 Chaostar (2000)
 Threnody (2001)
 The Scarlet Queen (2004)
 Underworld (2007)
 Anomima (2013)
 The Undivided Light (2018)

Members 
Current members
 Christos Antoniou – guitars, piano, synthesizer, orchestral arrangements (1998–present)
 Androniki Skoula – mezzo-soprano (2009–present)
 George Diamantopoulos – traditional instruments (2012–present)
 Charalampos Paritsis – electric violin (2012–present)
 Nick Vell – percussions (2013–present)

Past members
 Spiros Antoniou – bass, grunts (1998–2004)
 Sotiris Vayenas – guitars, clean vocals (1998–2004)
 Nathalie Rassoulis – soprano (1998–2004)
 Sapfo Stavridou – vocals (2006–2007)
 Dionisis Christodoulatos – keyboards (2013)
 Fotis Benardo – drums   (2012–2014)

External links 
Chaostar's Myspace
Christos Antoniou's website (archived)

Greek musical groups
Musical groups established in 1998
Dark wave musical groups
Season of Mist artists
1998 establishments in Greece